The football tournament at the 1960 Summer Olympics was held from 26 August to 10 September in 1960 throughout Italy. The tournament featured 16 men's national teams from four continental confederations. The 16 teams were drawn into four groups of four and each group played a round-robin tournament. At the end of the group stage, the first-ranked teams of each group advanced to the semi-finals, and culminating with the gold medal match in Rome on 10 September 1960.

Competition schedule
The match schedule of the tournament.

Venues

Medalists

Qualification

Squads

First round

Group A

Group B

Group C

Group D

Semi-finals

(Yugoslavia declared winners by lot)

Bronze Medal match

Gold Medal match

Semi-final bracket

Goal scorers

With seven goals, Milan Galić of Yugoslavia is the top scorer in the tournament. In total, 120 goals were scored by 56 different players, with only one of them credited as own goal.

7 goals

  Milan Galić (Yugoslavia)

6 goals

  Bora Kostić (Yugoslavia)

5 goals

  Harald Nielsen (Denmark)
  Flórián Albert (Hungary)
  János Dunai (Hungary)
  János Göröcs (Hungary)
  Ernest Pohl (Poland)

4 goals

  Juan Carlos Oleniak (Argentina)
  Gérson (Brazil)
  Bobby Brown (Great Britain)
  Giorgio Rossano (Italy)

3 goals

  Todor Diev (Bulgaria)
  Gianni Rivera (Italy)

2 goals

  José Ricardo da Silva (Brazil)
  Roberto Dias (Brazil)
  Spiro Debarski (Bulgaria)
  Flemming Nielsen (Denmark)
  Paddy Hasty (Great Britain)
  Jim Lewis (Great Britain)
  Tulsidas Balaram (India)
  Ugo Tomeazzi (Italy)
  Nicolas Nieri (Peru)
  Alberto Ramírez (Peru)
  Chuk Yin Yiu (Republic of China)
  Brahim Kerrit (Tunisia)
  Raafat Attia (United Arab Republic)
  Samir Qotb (United Arab Republic)
  Tomislav Knez (Yugoslavia)

1 goal

  Carlos Bilardo (Argentina)
  Raúl Adolfo Pérez (Argentina)
  Waldir (Brazil)
  Luiz Machado da Silva (Brazil)
  Hristo Hristov (Bulgaria)
  Georgi Naidenov Yordanov (Bulgaria)
  Henning Enoksen (Denmark)
  Poul Pedersen (Denmark)
  Jørn Sørensen (Denmark)
  Gérard Coinçon (France)
  André Giamarchi (France)
  Yvon Quédec (France)
  Pál Orosz (Hungary)
  Gyula Rákosi (Hungary)
  Pradip Kumar Banerjee (India)
  Giovanni Fanello (Italy)
  Paride Tumburus (Italy)
  Thomas Iwasaki (Peru)
  Ángel Uribe (Peru)
  Zygmunt Gadecki (Poland)
  Stanisław Hachorek (Poland)
  Mok Chun-wah (Republic of China)
  Mancef Cherif (Tunisia)
  Uğur Köken (Turkey)
  Bilge Tahran (Turkey)
  Ibrahim Yalcinkaya (Turkey)
  Željko Matuš (Yugoslavia)

Own goals
  El Sayed Rifai (United Arab Republic; playing against Yugoslavia)

Final ranking

References

External links

Olympic Football Tournament Rome 1960 at FIFA.com
Summary at RSSSF
Danish tournament squads  
Hungarian medalists – Rome 1960 (archived)

 
1960 Summer Olympics events
1960
1960 in association football
1960
1960–61 in Italian football